The women's 60 metres hurdles at the 2022 World Athletics Indoor Championships took place on 19 March 2022.

Results

Heats
Qualification: First 3 in each heat (Q) and the next 6 fastest (q) advance to the Semi-Finals

The heats were started at 10:30.

Semifinals
First 2 in each heat (Q) and the next 2 fastest (q) advance to the Final

The heats were started at 18:15.

Final
The final was started on 19 March at 21:08

References

60 metres hurdles
60 metres hurdles at the World Athletics Indoor Championships